The following outline is provided as an overview of and topical guide to the U.S. state of Arizona:

Arizona – sixth most extensive of the 50 states of the United States of America. Arizona is located in the Southwestern United States and it is noted for its desert climate, exceptionally hot summers, and mild winters, but the high country in the north features pine forests and mountain ranges with cooler and wetter weather than the lower deserts. On February 24, 1863, the United States created the Territory of Arizona. Arizona joined the Union as the 48th state on February 14, 1912.

General reference 

 Names
 Common name: Arizona
 Pronunciation:  
 Official name: State of Arizona
 Abbreviations and name codes
 Postal symbol: AZ
 ISO 3166-2 code:  US-AZ
 Internet second-level domain:  .az.us
 Nicknames
 Apache State
 Aztec State
 Baby State (during the 47 years that Arizona was the newest state in the Union)
 Copper State
 Grand Canyon State (currently used on license plates)
 Italy of America
 Sand Hill State
 Sunset State
 Sweetheart State
 Valentine State (Arizona gained statehood on February 14, 1912)
 Adjectival: Arizona
 Demonyms
 Arizonan
 Arizonian

Geography of Arizona 

 Geography of Arizona
 Arizona is: a U.S. state, a federal state of the United States of America
 Location
 Northern hemisphere
 Western hemisphere
 Americas
 North America
 Anglo America
 Northern America
 United States of America
 Contiguous United States
 Southwestern United States
 Mountain West United States
 Population of Arizona: 7,151,502 (2020 U.S. Census)
 Area of Arizona:
 Atlas of Arizona

Places in Arizona 
 Places in Arizona
 Cemeteries in Arizona
 Historic places in Arizona
 Ghost towns in Arizona
 National Historic Landmarks in Arizona
 National Register of Historic Places listings in Arizona
 Bridges on the National Register of Historic Places in Arizona
 National Natural Landmarks in Arizona
 National Parks in Arizona
 State parks in Arizona

Environment of Arizona 
 Climate of Arizona
 Superfund sites in Arizona
 Wildlife of Arizona
 Fauna of Arizona
 Birds of Arizona
 Reptiles
 Snakes of Arizona

Natural geographic features of Arizona 
 Lakes of Arizona
 Mountain ranges of Arizona
 Mountains of Arizona
 Rivers of Arizona
 Valleys of Arizona

Regions of Arizona 
 Regions of Arizona
 Arizona Strip
 Coconino Plateau
 Colorado Plateau
 Grand Canyon
 Kaibab Plateau
 Mogollon Plateau
 Mogollon Rim
 Mojave Desert
 Monument Valley
 North Central Arizona
 Northeast Arizona
 Northern Arizona
 Oak Creek Canyon
 Phoenix Metropolitan Area
 Safford micropolitan area
 San Francisco Volcanic Field
 Sonoran Desert
 Southern Arizona
 Verde Valley
 White Mountains

Administrative divisions of Arizona 

 The 15 counties of the state of Arizona
 Municipalities in Arizona
 Cities in Arizona
 State capital of Arizona: Phoenix
 Largest city in Arizona: Phoenix (fifth most populous city in the United States)
 City nicknames in Arizona
 Towns in Arizona

Demography of Arizona 
 Demographics of Arizona

Government and politics of Arizona 
 Politics of Arizona
 Form of government: U.S. state government
 United States congressional delegations from Arizona
 Arizona State Capitol
 Political party strength in Arizona

Branches of the government of Arizona 
 Government of Arizona

Executive branch of the government of Arizona 
 Governor of Arizona
 Lieutenant Governor of Arizona
 Secretary of State of Arizona
 State Treasurer of Arizona
 State departments
 Arizona Department of Transportation

Legislative branch of the government of Arizona 
 Arizona Legislature (bicameral)
 Upper house: Arizona Senate
 Lower house: Arizona House of Representatives

Judicial branch of the government of Arizona 
 Courts of Arizona
 Supreme Court of Arizona

Law and order in Arizona 
 Law of Arizona
 Cannabis in Arizona
 Capital punishment in Arizona
 Individuals executed in Arizona
 Constitution of Arizona
 Crime in Arizona
 Gun laws in Arizona
 Law enforcement in Arizona
 Law enforcement agencies in Arizona

Military in Arizona 
 Arizona Air National Guard
 Arizona Army National Guard

Local government in Arizona 
 Local government in Arizona

History of Arizona 
 History of Arizona

History of Arizona, by period 
 Prehistory of Arizona
 European colonization of Arizona
 Spanish period of Arizona, 1539–1821
 Nueva Vizcaya, 1577–1733
 Pimería Alta, 1687–1733
 Spanish missions in the Sonoran Desert since 1687
 Sonora y Sinaloa, 1733–1821
 El Presidio Reál San Ignacio de Tubac established 1752
 Mexican period of Arizona, 1821–1848
 Sonora y Sinaloa, 1824–1830
 Sonora, 1830–1848
 Republic of Sonora, 1853–1854
 Gadsden Purchase of 1853–1854
 Confederate Territory of Arizona, 1861–1865
 Territory of Arizona, 1863–1912
 Loss of territory to the state of Nevada, 1867
 Powell Geographic Expedition of 1869
 James Reavis, The 'Baron of Arizona', 1870s–1890s
 Theodore Roosevelt Dam completed 1911
 State of Arizona becomes the 48th state admitted to the United States of America on February 14, 1912
 Grand Canyon National Park designated on February 26, 1919
 Hoover Dam completed 1936
 The Great Depression and the World Wars in Arizona
 Petrified Forest National Park designated on December 9, 1962
 Saguaro National Park designated on October 4, 1994

History of Arizona, by region 
 History of Phoenix, Arizona

History of Arizona, by subject 
 History of sports in Arizona
 History of the Arizona Cardinals
 History of universities in Arizona
 History of Arizona State University
 Uranium mining in Arizona
 Territorial evolution of Arizona

Culture of Arizona 
 Culture of Arizona
 Cuisine of Arizona
 Tex-Mex
 Museums in Arizona
 Religion in Arizona
 The Church of Jesus Christ of Latter-day Saints in Arizona
 Episcopal Diocese of Arizona
 Scouting in Arizona
 State symbols of Arizona
 Flag of the State of Arizona 
 Great Seal of the State of Arizona

The arts in Arizona 
 Music of Arizona

Sports in Arizona 
 Sports in Arizona

Economy and infrastructure of Arizona 
Economy of Arizona
 Communications in Arizona
 Newspapers in Arizona
 Radio stations in Arizona
 Television stations in Arizona
 Energy in Arizona
 List of power stations in Arizona
 Solar power in Arizona
 Wind power in Arizona
 Health care in Arizona
 Hospitals in Arizona
 Mining in Arizona
 Copper mining in Arizona
 Silver mining in Arizona
 Uranium mining in Arizona
 Transportation in Arizona
 Airports in Arizona
 Roads in Arizona
 State highways in Arizona

Education in Arizona 
 Education in Arizona
 Schools in Arizona
 School districts in Arizona
 High schools in Arizona
 Colleges and universities in Arizona
 University of Arizona
 Arizona State University
 Northern Arizona University

See also

 Topic overview:
 Arizona

 Index of Arizona-related articles

References

External links 

 Arizona Open Directory Project DMOZ
 Official Website of the State of Arizona
 Arizona State Guide, from the Library of Congress
 Arizona Regional Accounts Data
 Arizona Demographic Data from FedStats
 Community profiles from Arizona Department of Commerce
 Arizona Indicators, state's central resource for information on a wide range of topics
 Energy Data & Statistics for Arizona
 Arizona State Databases – Annotated list of searchable databases produced by Arizona state agencies and compiled by the Government Documents Roundtable of the American Library Association.
 Arizona State Library, Archives and Public Records
 USGS real-time, geographic, and other scientific resources of Arizona
 Arizona State Facts
 Arizona Classifieds
 Morrison Institute for Public Policy, independent research and analysis center for Arizona public policy and issues
 
 

 Tourism information
 Official Arizona Office of Tourism
 Arizona Game & Fish Department (Hunting, Boating & Fishing)
 Arizona State Parks
 American Southwest, a National Park Service Discover Our Shared Heritage Travel Itinerary

Arizona
Arizona